The Rochester Red Wings are a Minor League Baseball team of the International League and the Triple-A affiliate of the Washington Nationals. They are located in Rochester, New York, and play their home games at Innovative Field, located in downtown Rochester. Founded in 1899, they are the oldest continuously operating sports franchise in North America below the major league level.

Since the widespread adoption of the minor league farm system in the 1920s, the Red Wings have been affiliated with four Major League Baseball clubs, an unusually stable series of relationships. They were the top farm team of the St. Louis Cardinals for 32 years (1929–1960), Baltimore Orioles for 42 years (1961–2002), and Minnesota Twins for 18 years (2003–2020). They then became the Triple-A affiliate of the Nationals in 2021.

The franchise played from 1929 through 1996 at Silver Stadium (called Red Wing Stadium from 1929 to 1968) and moved to Frontier Field in 1997.

The Red Wings, along with the Pawtucket Red Sox, hold the record for the longest professional baseball game, lasting a total of 33 innings and 8 hours, 25 minutes over the course of three different days. The game was held at Pawtucket's McCoy Stadium, beginning on April 18, 1981. It was suspended just after 4 a.m. the next morning, and Rochester lost, 3–2, when the game resumed on June 23.

Baseball in Rochester
Baseball in Rochester dates back to 1877 with the "Rochesters" of the International Association, and Rochester has had a franchise in the league now known as the International League as early as 1885.

According to Rochester sports historian Douglas Brei, only six franchises in the history of North American professional sports have been playing in the same city and same league continuously and uninterrupted since the 19th century: the Rochester Red Wings, Chicago Cubs, Cincinnati Reds, Philadelphia Phillies, Pittsburgh Pirates and St. Louis Cardinals. He also reports that the Red Wings and the Hamilton Tiger-Cats of the Canadian Football League are the only two franchises in North American professional sports to have captured a league championship in every decade of the 20th century.

Franchise history

Early history (1899–1928)
The current franchise has been playing in Rochester since 1899, when the team was known as the Rochester Bronchos and won the Eastern League championship in its inaugural season.

Cardinals era (1929–1960)
Aside from the affiliation, the Cardinals also owned the Wings and their stadium, then known as Red Wing Stadium. The early years of the Cardinals and Red Wings saw the Red Wings very much a power house, not unlike their parent club. The team was managed by Billy Southworth (who split time managing the team in 1929 with Bill McKechnie), and from 1929 to 1931, the team won the International League championship. In a true statement of how dominant a team they were, they won 103 games in 1929, 105 games in 1930, and 101 games in 1931. The team would remain competitive for many years, with 1935 and 1937 being the only years that they lost more games than they won. The return of Billy Southworth in 1939 brought another league championship to Rochester.

Lean times were ahead for Rochester, with the 1940s finding the Red Wings on the bottom half of the standings. Even former famed pitcher Burleigh Grimes could not change the team's fortunes. He lasted a little more than a season and a half when he was replaced by Benny Borgmann. The team would capture three more league championships in the Cardinals era, those coming in 1952, 1955, and 1956. In response, Morrie Silver, a Rochester businessman, formed Rochester Community Baseball, Inc. (RCB) and spearheaded a drive to sell shares in RCB to raise money to buy the Red Wings and Red Wing Stadium to ensure that the franchise would remain in Rochester. The attempt was successful as RCB purchased both entities from the Cardinals on February 27, 1957, in an event that was dubbed the "72 Day Miracle". RCB, composed of fans of the team as shareholders, continues to own and operate the club to this day, making the Red Wings one of two current American professional sports franchises that are publicly owned. The Green Bay Packers of the National Football League are the most notable example of this distinction.

In 1959, the Red Wings were involved in one of minor league baseball's most infamous games. While playing in Havana, Cuba, the Red Wings' July 25 game against the Havana Sugar Kings was interrupted at midnight by gunfire and fireworks in celebration of the 26th of July Movement. Rochester's Frank Verdi, standing in as third-base coach in place of manager Cot Deal, who had been ejected earlier in the game, was grazed by a bullet, as was Leo Cárdenas, the Sugar Kings' shortstop. Neither player was seriously injured, but both the game and then the series were canceled.

The Wings remained St. Louis' affiliate until , when the Red Wings moved on to become the top farm club of the Baltimore Orioles.

Orioles era (1961–2002)
After two straight fourth-place finishes, and early exits from the playoffs, the Red Wings dismissed Clyde King, a hold over from the Cardinals era, as manager of the team, and named Darrell Johnson in his place. Johnson never managed a finish better than fourth during his tenure, however, in 1964, with an 82–72 record, Johnson's Red Wings managed to win yet another championship. He was replaced by Earl Weaver, who showed great promise as a manager. After two seasons, Weaver was brought up to manage the Baltimore Orioles, and he was replaced by Billy DeMars, who lasted one season before being replaced by Cal Ripken Sr. After two seasons, Ripken was replaced by Joe Altobelli. Red Wing Stadium was renamed Silver Stadium in honor of Morrie Silver on August 19, 1968. From 1971 to 1976, the Red Wings never missed the playoffs, capturing two more league titles in the process in 1971 and 1974. Altobelli returned to the Red Wings after his retirement from the coaching ranks, serving as general manager from late 1991 to 1994 and then as part of the radio broadcasting team through 2008.

1978 was a terrible season for the Red Wings, as the club had three managers, Ken Boyer, Al Widmar, and Frank Robinson. The team finished 68–72. Robinson was replaced by Doc Edwards, who managed to get the team to the playoffs in 1980, but could not manage a league title. Edwards was soon gone, replaced by Lance Nicholls, who in turn, was replaced by former Tidewater Tides manager Frank Verdi. The team did horribly under Verdi, and was mainly stocked with cast off former major leaguers, career minor league players, and very few prospects. The only bona fide major league prospect on the team during this lean period was Larry Sheets, who was mainly a journeyman hitter during his career.

Verdi was fired midway through 1985, with the Red Wings at 18–40. Under his replacement, first base coach Mark Wiley, the Red Wings went 40-41 the rest of the season.

There would be a return to glory, when the Red Wings named John Hart as the new manager. He was able to guide the team into the playoffs during his two-year stint, but none resulted in a championship. However, Hart impressed the Orioles, and he was soon off to the majors. His replacement was former New York Yankees catcher Johnny Oates. Oates won the league title in his first year and only year at the helm. His replacement was Greg Biagini. In 1990, Biagini led a loaded Red Wings team, which featured future Red Sox hero Curt Schilling, to the league championship.

In 1993, the Red Wings, guided by manager Bob Miscik, reached the International League finals but lost to the Charlotte Knights in five games.

In 1997, the Red Wings moved into the new Frontier Field in downtown Rochester after 68 seasons at Silver Stadium on the city's northeast side. That same year, manager Marv Foley led the Wings to a league title.

In 2000, during the team's fourth year at the stadium, the Red Wings played host to the Triple-A All-Star Game.

By , the fifth consecutive losing season for Rochester and what would be the last year of the player development agreement between Baltimore and Rochester, the team's record slipped to a league-worst 55–89. The Red Wings' affiliation with the Orioles ended when it signed a working agreement with the Minnesota Twins on September 17, 2002.

Twins era (2003–2020)

The Red Wings' first season as the Twins' Triple-A affiliate was the team's sixth consecutive losing season. The turnaround was capped in  when Rochester, now under the leadership of Stan Cliburn, advanced to the International League playoffs as the Wild Card with a record of 79–64. The Red Wings then beat the Scranton/Wilkes-Barre Red Barons three games to one in the best-of-five semifinal series but lost to the Toledo Mud Hens in five games, three games to two, in the best-of-five Governors' Cup series.

Rochester followed up their run to the 2006 Governors' Cup Finals by posting a winning record in each of the next two seasons, bringing the streak of consecutive winning seasons to five. In , the team went 74–70 after being as far as 13 games under .500 at one point (19–32 on May 25). The streak was snapped in  after the team finished 70–74. On September 21, 2009, the Minnesota Twins announced that they would not renew manager Stan Cliburn's contract for the 2010 season. According to Twins farm director Jim Rantz, the change was made as part of an "overall directional change that is being implemented throughout the minor-league system."  Former New Britain Rock Cats manager Tom Nieto was Cliburn's replacement. Nieto was fired at the close of the 2011 season after leading the Red Wings to their first back-to-back 90-loss seasons since 1903–04.

On November 25, 2011 Gene Glynn was announced as the new Red Wings manager for 2012.  The 2012 season saw the Red Wings scratch out a .500 record, considered a vast improvement over the Nieto years.  With Glynn continuing as manager, the 2013 Wings got off to a dismal 2–11 start, but slowly improved before turning red-hot in July.  At some points they led the North Division, but a late surge by Pawtucket relegated the Wings to a fight for the IL's lone wild card spot.  They secured the wild card on the last day of the season, based on a tiebreaker with the Norfolk Tides, leading the Wings to their first postseason appearance since 2006. The following season's playoff push came down to the final series of the year in Pawtucket, but a loss on August 31 put them out of the picture for good.

After the 2014 season, Gene Glynn was promoted to become the third base coach for the major league Minnesota Twins.

To replace Glynn, the Red Wings announced on January 30, 2015, that former Chicago Cubs' manager Mike Quade would be taking over for the 2015 season, a position he retained for three years through the 2017 campaign.

On January 17, 2018 former MLB catcher, coach and manager Joel Skinner was named as the 45th manager of the team.

The start of the 2020 season was postponed due to the COVID-19 pandemic before ultimately being cancelled on June 30.

On November 10, 2020, Twins management disclosed to the Red Wings that they would be discontinuing their partnership as part of the broad changes in the minor league system for the 2021 season and beyond.

Nationals era (2021–present)

Beginning with the 2021 season, the Red Wings became the Triple-A affiliate of the Washington Nationals. As a further result of Major League Baseball's restructuring of Minor League Baseball in 2021, the Red Wings were organized into the Triple-A East. Under former major league catcher and veteran minor league coach Matthew LeCroy, Rochester ended the 2021 season tied for fifth place in the Northeastern Division with a 47–69 record. No playoffs were held to determine a league champion; instead, the team with the best regular-season record was declared the winner. However, 10 games that had been postponed from the start of the season were reinserted into the schedule as a postseason tournament called the Triple-A Final Stretch in which all 30 Triple-A clubs competed for the highest winning percentage. Rochester finished the tournament in 27th place with a 2–8 record. In 2022, the Triple-A East became known as the International League, the name historically used by the regional circuit prior to the 2021 reorganization.

Titles
The Red Wings have played for the Governors' Cup, the championship of the International League, 21 times, winning 10.

1933 – Lost to Buffalo
1934 – Lost to Toronto
1939 – Defeated Newark
1950 – Lost to Baltimore
1952 – Defeated Montréal
1953 – Lost to Montréal
1955 – Defeated Toronto
1956 – Defeated Toronto
1960 – Lost to Toronto
1961 – Lost to Buffalo
1964 – Defeated Syracuse
1971 – Defeated Tidewater
1974 – Defeated Syracuse
1982 – Lost to Tidewater
1986 – Lost to Richmond
1988 – Defeated Tidewater
1990 – Defeated Columbus
1993 – Lost to Charlotte
1996 – Lost to Columbus
1997 – Defeated Columbus
2006 – Lost to Toledo

Year-by-year records

∗ Tied by record with Lehigh Valley IronPigs but lost in tiebreaking procedures.

Mascots 

The Rochester Red Wings' mascots are a pair of anthropomorphic birds named Spikes and Mittsy. Spikes is bright red with a yellow beak. He wears a uniform similar to that of the team. Mittsy is yellow with an orange beak and red hair. She wears a red uniform with yellow trim accompanied by two pink bracelets. Spikes was created in the off-season before the 1997 season, the same year in which the Red Wings got their new stadium, Frontier Field. The names refer to cleats or "spikes" baseball players wear and catcher's mitts, respectively. Before Spikes was created, the team mascot was a red and black bat character known as Wild Fang, who was with the team from 1992 to 1997, when he was retired once the team moved to Frontier Field.

Roster

Retired numbers
The Red Wings have retired three numbers, two of which are derived from uniform numbers:

26: Joe Altobelli, often referred to as "Mr. Baseball" in the Rochester area. As manager, "Alto" led the Red Wings to two Governors' Cup titles.
36: Luke Easter.
8222: Morrie Silver. The number retired in his honor, 8,222, represents the original number of shareholders of Rochester Community Baseball, Inc.

Altobelli's number 26 and the number 8,222 representing Silver were both retired prior to the final regular season game at Silver Stadium on August 30, 1996.

Awards and honors
 In 1970, Roger Freed was named International League MVP along with George Kopacz of the Columbus Jets.
 In 1971, Bobby Grich was named International League MVP.
 In 1973, Jim Fuller was named International League MVP.
 In 1976, Rich Dauer was named International League MVP along with Mickey Klutts of the Syracuse Chiefs and Joe Lis of the Toledo Mud Hens.
 In 1988, Craig Worthington was named International League MVP.
 In 1994, Jeff Manto was named International League MVP.
 In 1996 and 1997, general manager Dan Mason was named International League Executive of the Year. Mason won the award a third time in 2012.
 In 1998, Rochester was named "Baseball City, U.S.A." by Baseball America.
 In 2008, team COO and chairman Naomi Silver was named Minor League Executive of the Year by Baseball America.
 In 2012, longtime team comptroller Darlene Giardina (1990–present) was named Rawlings Woman Executive of the Year by Minor League Baseball.
 In 2013, Chris Colabello was named International League MVP.

Notable alumni

Players and on-field staff

Walter Alston
Joe Altobelli (player, manager)
Brady Anderson
Bob Bailor
Jason Bartlett
Sammy Baugh
Don Baylor
Steve Bechler
Mark Belanger
Armando Benítez
Paul Blair
Curt Blefary
Mike Boddicker
Ken Boyer (manager)
Al Bumbry
Enos Cabell
Allie Clark
Ripper Collins
Terry Crowley
Michael Cuddyer
Steve Dalkowski
Rich Dauer
Doug DeCinces
Paul Derringer
Luke Easter
Mike Epstein
Andy Etchebarren
Steve Finley
Mike Flanagan
Jim Frey
Kiko Garcia
Matt Garza
Bob Gibson
Bobby Grich
Jerry Hairston Jr.
Jeffrey Hammonds
Jim Hardin
Pete Harnisch
John Hart
Chris Hoiles
Rex Hudler
Davey Johnson
Garrett Jones
Eddie Joost
Jorge Julio
Jason Kubel
Jeff Manto
Marty Marion
Dennis Martínez
Joe Mauer
Tim McCarver
Jose Mesa
Johnny Mize
Justin Morneau
Jamie Moyer
Eddie Murray
Danny Murtaugh
Stan Musial
Mike Mussina
Jerry Narron (manager)
Pat Neshek
Johnny Oates (player, manager)
Fritz Ostermueller
Sidney Ponson
Boog Powell
Wilson Ramos
Arthur Rhodes
Billy Ripken
Cal Ripken Jr.
Cal Ripken Sr. (player, manager)
Brian Roberts
Frank Robinson (manager)
Preacher Roe
Goody Rosen
Curt Schilling
Red Schoendienst
David Segui
John Shelby
Ron Shelton
Kevin Slowey
Billy Southworth (Manager)
Andrés Torres
Specs Toporcer
Josh Towers
Danny Valencia
Bill Virdon
Earl Weaver (manager)
 Phil Weintraub
Eli Whiteside
Alan Wiggins
Craig Worthington
Esteban Yan
Gregg Zaun

Front office and other staff

Joe Altobelli (general manager, announcer) (1998-2008 as announcer)
Russ Brandon
Jack Buck (announcer) (1953)
Eric Collins (announcer) (1996)
Joe Cullinane (announcer) (1962–74)
Bing Devine (general manager)
Glenn Geffner (announcer) (1994–96)
Warren Giles 
Howie Haak (traveling secretary)
Frank Horton (team president)
Joe Kehoskie
Josh Lewin (announcer) (1986–94)
Dan Lunetta
Dan Mason (general manager)
Naomi Silver (chairman and COO)
George Sisler Jr.
Bob Socci (announcer) (1991–92)
Pete Weber (announcer) (1982–84)

Notes

References

External links

Rochester, New York Minor League History at Baseball-Reference.com
Photographs of Red Wing / Silver Stadium, former home of the Rochester Red Wings - Rochester Area Ballparks
Photographs of Frontier Field, current home of the Rochester Red Wings - Rochester Area Ballparks

 
International League teams
Professional baseball teams in New York (state)
St. Louis Cardinals minor league affiliates
Baltimore Orioles minor league affiliates
Minnesota Twins minor league affiliates
Baseball teams established in 1899
1899 establishments in New York (state)
Fan-owned baseball teams
Washington Nationals minor league affiliates
Triple-A East teams